SS was a Japanese hardcore punk band. They were most likely the first Japanese band to play punk rock in a high-speed, minimalist hardcore style comparable to that played by US bands such as Black Flag, Middle Class, and Bad Brains, and indeed SS was contemporaneous with the earliest incarnations of those three bands.

SS comprised Tommy SS on vocals, Jun SS on guitar, Tsuyoshi SS on bass, and Takami SS on drums. The entire recorded output of SS consisted of two live albums, both released years after the performances that they immortalized took place: The Original SS, recorded in March 1979, released on vinyl in 1984; and SS Live!, recorded in June 1979, released on CD in 1990. These performances were almost simultaneous with the recording of the Bad Brains' first demos. Both albums were remastered and released together on a single CD, also titled SS Live!, in 2001.
 
The vast majority of the songs on both albums are less than a minute long, with only a single track clocking in at more than two minutes. Most of the songs on these albums are originals, except for covers of "Blitzkrieg Bop" by The Ramones (played at both performances) and "First Time" by The Boys. Both songs were played faster than the original version.

Discography
The Original SS Alchemy Records (ARLP-002), 1984
SS Live! Alchemy Records (ARCD-0014), 1990
SS Live! (both albums, remastered) Alchemy Records (ARCD-129), 2001

Compilation 
 (VHS) Rockers (July 1, 1989)
 (DVD) ROCKERS (July 3, 2009)
 3. Mr. Twist / 15. Coca Cola (Live at Shimokitazawa Loft, Dec 31st 1978)

Japanese hardcore punk groups